Agrahara, Kadur  is a village in the southern state of Karnataka, India. It is located in the Kadur taluk of Chikkamagaluru district in Karnataka.

See also
 Chikmagalur
 Districts of Karnataka

References

External links
 http://Chikmagalur.nic.in/

Villages in Chikkamagaluru district